Ahmed Rafiuddin (born 28 June 1936) is an Indian former cricketer. He played six first-class matches for Hyderabad between 1957 and 1959.

See also
 List of Hyderabad cricketers

References

External links
 

1936 births
Living people
Indian cricketers
Hyderabad cricketers
Cricketers from Hyderabad, India